Rasboroides nigromarginatus is a species of freshwater cyprinid fish endemic to Sri Lanka where only known from small, shaded streams in the Atweltota region of the Kalu River basin. It can also be found in the aquarium trade.

Long considered a synonym of R. vaterifloris, R. nigromarginatus was revalidated as a species in 2013. A comprehensive taxonomic review in 2018 based on morphometry, meristics and mtDNA disputed this, returning it to being a synonym of R. vaterifloris.

References

Rasboroides
Fish of Asia
Fish described in 1957